, also known as OTV, is a Japanese broadcast network affiliated with the FNN/FNS. Their headquarters are located in Okinawa Prefecture.

It is the first commercial broadcaster to operate within Okinawa during the American occupation in the prefecture.

History

Early history 
The American Forces Radio and Television Service (AFRTS), which began airing in 1955, was Okinawa's first television station. Because the initial transmission power was just 250 watts, it was virtually unknown in Japan outside of the US military. In July 1956, the administrative chairman of the Ryukyu Government, applied for the establishment for a television station; the preparatory license was granted in February 1958, and the inaugural meeting was held in April of the same year.

At that time, when Okinawa was under the rule of the United States, Okinawa TV was subject to restrictions in terms of foreign ownership, which made it difficult for them to operate. It then resulted in the forming of "Tokyo Okinawa TV Corporation", a joint company between Fuji TV and OTV, to attract advertisers from Tokyo. This is one of the reasons why OTV joined as a Fuji TV affiliate.

December 25, 1955: Okinawa TV were established, and had first started its beta operations upon its early birth.
July 16, 1956: The station receives its application for its TV broadcasting license and are therefore starting its demo emissions.
May 12, 1958: Its company were registered, as the broadcaster begins its test transmissions.
November 1, 1959: Okinawa TV adopts its first logo, as the network gets into on-air and commences its official broadcasts, although it were set up as Okinawa Prefecture's first broadcaster. The initial calls were KSDW-TV, on channel 10.
May 5, 1968: Color transmissions begin.
May 15, 1972: When the United States returned Okinawa back to Japan, the station was brought under Japanese regulatory control under the new call sign of JOOF-TV. The station continued to broadcast on the same frequency (192–198 MHz), which is designated channel 10 in the United States but channel 8 in Japan.
December 1, 2006: Digital terrestrial television and 1seg transmissions started from their Naha main station.
July 24, 2011: Analog transmissions end.

Stations

Analog
Naha (Main Station) JOOF-TV 8ch 5 kW
Izena-West 50ch 0.1w
Izena-East 58ch 0.1w
Kumejima 57ch 30w
Kumejima-East 61ch 1w
Hedona 55ch 0.1w
Nakijin 32ch 300w
Motobu 58ch 0.1w
Untembaru 60ch 0.1w
Goga 59ch 0.1w
Agarie 50ch 1w
Sukuta 60ch 0.1w
Henoko 58ch 0.1w
Onna 37ch 3w
Ishikawa 56ch 3w
Gushikawa 52ch 10w
Goya 20ch 10w
Takaharu 49ch 0.1w
Kita-Nakagusuku 57ch 0.1w
Ginowan 37ch 10w
Aja 52ch 0.1w
Shuri-Yamagawa 47ch 0.1w
Shuri 57ch 3w
Sashiki 56ch 30w
Shikiya 58ch 0.1w

Digital (ID:8)
Naha (Main Station) JOOF-DTV 15ch

Programs
OTV Prime News - from 16:55 until 18:55 on Weekdays
Kyōdo Gekijō (The Local Theater) - from 15:00 until 15:55 on Thursdays
Kurashi to Keizai(Life and Economy) - from 16:50 until 16:55 on Fridays

Rival Stations
Ryukyu Broadcasting Corporation (RBC)
Ryukyu Asahi Broadcasting (QAB)

See also
NHK
Ryukyu Shimpo

Notes

References

Other links
Okinawa Television

Fuji News Network
Television stations in Japan
Mass media in Okinawa Prefecture
Companies based in Okinawa Prefecture
Mass media companies established in 1955
Television channels and stations established in 1955
Mass media in Naha